The Clarkson Golden Knights women's ice hockey program represented Clarkson University during the 2017–18 NCAA Division I women's ice hockey season. The Golden Knights entered the season as the defending national champions as well as the ECAC regular season and tournament champions. They also entered the season as the top-ranked team in both the USCHO.com and the USA Today/USA Hockey Magazine polls for the first time.

In their most successful season to date, the Golden Knights successfully defended all three titles. After splitting the ECAC regular season title with Colgate, the Golden Knights won the ECAC title over said Colgate team 3–0. They followed up their conference championship by advancing to their third NCAA title game, where they once again beat Colgate 2–1 in overtime to win the program's third national title. In addition to the NCAA championship game, the Golden Knights won both of their other NCAA tournament games in overtime, becoming the first team to win all three NCAA tournament games in overtime en route to a title.

Offseason

Recruiting

Roster

Standings

Schedule

|-
!colspan=12 style=""| Regular Season

|-
!colspan=12 style=""| ECAC Hockey Tournament

|-
!colspan=12 style=""| NCAA Tournament

Awards and honors

Jenna Brenneman – ECAC Hockey weekly Honor Roll (2/5)
Loren Gabel – Patty Kazmaier Award finalist, NCAA All-Tournament Team, First Team AHCA All-American, First Team All-USCHO.com, ECAC Hockey Player of the Year, ECAC Hockey Best Forward, ECAC Hockey All-Tournament Team, ECAC Hockey First Team All-Star, HCA Player of the Month (January), ECAC Hockey Player of the Month (October, December, January), NCAA First Star of the Week (1/23, 2/27) ECAC Hockey Player of the Week (10/2, 10/31, 12/12, 1/23, 1/30, 2/26), ECAC Hockey weekly Honor Roll (10/16,  1/16, 2/5, 2/20)
Elizabeth Giguere – NCAA All-Tournament Team, Second Team ACHA All-America, Second Team All-USCHO.com, ECAC Hockey Rookie of the Year, ECAC Hockey First Team All-Star, ECAC Hockey All-Rookie Team, HCA Rookie of the Month (December, March), ECAC Hockey Rookie of the Month (October, December, January), ECAC Hockey Player of the Week (10/24), ECAC Hockey Rookie of the Week (10/2, 10/9, 10/24, 11/7, 11/14, 12/5, 12/12, 1/23, 1/30, 2/5, 3/6), ECAC Hockey weekly Honor Roll (10/16, 1/16, 2/12, 2/20)
Savannah Harmon – Patty Kazmaier Award Top 10, NCAA All-Tournament Team, First Team AHCA All-America, First Team All-USCHO.com, ECAC Hockey Best Defenseman, ECAC Hockey All-Tournament Team, ECAC Hockey First Team All-Star, ECAC Hockey weekly Honor Roll (10/9, 11/7, 12/5)
Rhyen McGill – ECAC Hockey weekly Honor Roll (2/12)
Michaela Pejzlova – ECAC Hockey Tournament Most Outstanding Player, ECAC Hockey All-Tournament Team, ECAC Hockey Second Team All-Star, ECAC Hockey Player of the Week (3/6), ECAC Hockey weekly Honor Roll (11/14, 11/21)
Kristy Pidgeon – ECAC Hockey weekly Honor Roll (11/21)
Ella Shelton – ECAC Hockey All-Tournament Team, ECAC Hockey Second Team All-Star
Shea Tiley — Patty Kazmaier Award Top 10, NCAA Tournament Most Outstanding Player, NCAA All-Tournament Team, First Team AHCA All-American, First Team All-USCHO.com, ECAC Hockey Goaltender of the Year, ECAC Hockey All-Tournament Team, ECAC Hockey First Team All-Star, HCA Player of the Month (December, March), ECAC Hockey Goaltender of the Month (October, December, February), NCAA Second Star of the Week (12/12), NCAA Third Star of the Week (12/5), ECAC Hockey Goaltender of the Week (10/2, 10/24, 12/5, 12/12, 3/6), ECAC Hockey weekly Honor Roll (10/9, 10/16, 11/7, 11/14, 11/21, 1/16, 1/23, 1/30, 2/12, 2/20)
Matt Desrosiers – ECAC Hockey Coach of the Year

References

Clarkson
Clarkson Golden Knights women's ice hockey seasons
NCAA women's ice hockey Frozen Four seasons
NCAA women's ice hockey championship seasons